The 1920 United States presidential election in Connecticut took place on November 2, 1920, as part of the 1920 United States presidential election which was held throughout all contemporary 48 states. Voters chose seven representatives, or electors to the Electoral College, who voted for president and vice president. 

Connecticut voted for Republican nominee, Senator Warren G. Harding of Ohio, over the Democratic nominee, Governor James M. Cox of Ohio. Harding ran with Governor Calvin Coolidge of Massachusetts, while Cox ran with Assistant Secretary of the Navy Franklin D. Roosevelt of New York. 

Harding won Connecticut by a margin of 29.69%. His victory in the New England states was helped by the local popularity of his running mate, Calvin Coolidge, a traditional New England Yankee born in the small-town of Plymouth Notch, Vermont, who had started his political career nearby as Governor of Massachusetts.

Results

Results by town

See also
 United States presidential elections in Connecticut

References

 

Connecticut
1920
1920 Connecticut elections